The king jird (Meriones rex)  is a species of rodent in the family Muridae.
It is found in Saudi Arabia and Yemen.

References

Meriones (rodent)
Mammals described in 1895
Taxonomy articles created by Polbot